Cannabis Regulation and Taxation Act may refer to one of the following:

Illinois Cannabis Regulation and Tax Act, passed in 2019
New York Cannabis Regulation and Taxation Act, failed 2021 bill
Marijuana Regulation and Taxation Act, passed in 2021
2018 Michigan Proposal 1, titled Michigan Regulation and Taxation of Marijuana Act, passed in 2018